Urapteroides is a genus of moths in the family Uraniidae.

Distribution
The genus includes mainly nocturnal or crepuscular moths that are found from Nepal to the Indo-Australian tropics and parts of continental Southeast Asia. Species have a generally pale or nearly white coloration with darker markings.

Description
Palpi slight and porrect (extending forward). Antennae of male thickened and flattened, of female simple. Forewings broad, veins 3 and 4 stalked, and veins 6 and 7 stalked. Veins 10 and 11 present. Hindwings with an angled tail at vein 4 and veins 3 and 4 stalked.

Species
 Urapteroides anerces Meyrick, 1886 (Fiji)
 Urapteroides astheniata (Guenée, 1857) (Himalaya to New Guinea, Queensland)
 Urapteroides diana Swinhoe (Peninsular Malaysia) (possibly a form of U. astheniata)
 Urapteroides equestraria Boisduval
 Urapteroides hermaea Druce, 1888
 Urapteroides hyemalis Butler, 1887 (Solomons, Vanuatu)
 Urapteroides malgassaria Mabille, 1878
 Urapteroides recurvata Warren, 1898 (Kenya, South Africa, Tanzania)
 Urapteroides swinhoei Rothschild
 Urapteroides urapterina Butler, 1877

References

External links

Uraniidae